Jack van Gelder (born 27 December 1950) is a Dutch sport commentator and television presenter. He presented many sports television programs of the broadcasting organization NOS, including NOS Studio Sportzomer, NOS Studio Voetbal and NOS Langs de Lijn, for forty years.

He is also known for presenting Te land, ter zee en in de lucht. In 2009, he presented the Nationaal Songfestival, an annual competition held almost every year between 1956 and 2012 to select the country's representative for the Eurovision Song Contest.

In 2014, he won the Theo Koomen Award, an annual award for best sports reporting or commentary.

He played the role of Pontius Pilate in the 2014 edition of The Passion, a Dutch Passion Play held every Maundy Thursday since 2011.

In 2021, he appeared in an episode of The Masked Singer. He also appears in the 2022 film Het Feest van Tante Rita.

References

External links 

 

1950 births
Dutch Jews
Living people
Dutch television presenters
Dutch sports journalists
Sports commentators
Dutch association football commentators
Nationaal Songfestival presenters